Roxana Scarlat-Bârlădeanu (born 3 January 1975) is a Romanian fencer. She won a silver medal in the women's team foil event at the 1996 Summer Olympics.

Scarlat retired from competition after missing the qualification for the 2008 Summer Olympics. She is now an official of the Romanian Fencing Federation.

She married Marius Bârlădeanu. The couple have two sons, Tudor-Ioan and Vlad-Iustin.

References

External links
 

1975 births
Living people
Romanian female fencers
Romanian foil fencers
Olympic fencers of Romania
Fencers at the 1996 Summer Olympics
Fencers at the 2004 Summer Olympics
Olympic silver medalists for Romania
Olympic medalists in fencing
Sportspeople from Bucharest
Medalists at the 1996 Summer Olympics